Ulmus parvifolia 'Emer II or Emerald Vase (selling name ) is a Chinese Elm cultivar that was cloned from a tree planted circa 1910 on the University of Georgia campus at Athens.

Description
 can reach a height of about 15 m, with a more upright crown shape than its stablemate , its spread approximately 13 m, with arching branches bearing medium green, glossy leaves turning orange to rust red in autumn.  The exfoliating, mottled bark has a puzzle-like pattern, and is considered attractive.

Pests and diseases
The species and its cultivars are highly resistant, but not immune, to Dutch elm disease, and unaffected by the Elm Leaf Beetle Xanthogaleruca luteola. As with the species overall, damage caused by Japanese Beetle is relatively slight (< 8% defoliation).

Cultivation
 is reputedly drought tolerant, but in the elm trials  conducted by Northern Arizona University at Holbrook, Arizona,  proved unsuited to the hot, arid climate and sustained over 50% mortality in its first year, as did its sibling . The tree is being evaluated in the National Elm Trial  coordinated by Colorado State University.  has been introduced to Australia and Europe , and was marketed briefly in England by the Thornhayes Nursery, Devon.

Accessions
North America
Bartlett Tree Experts, North Carolina, US. Acc. no. 2001-166
Holden Arboretum, US. Acc. no. 98-26
Brenton Arboretum, Dallas Center, Iowa, US. One tree, acquired 2009. Acc. no. not known.
Scott Arboretum, US. Acc. no. 2000-006
Smith College, US. Acc. nos 302, 33603
University of Idaho arboretum, US. One tree. Acc. no. 1998010
U S National Arboretum , Washington, D.C., US. Acc. no. 64442

Nurseries
North America
(Widely available)
Australasia
Fleming's Nursery , Monbulk, Victoria, Australia.

References

External links
http://www.ces.ncsu.edu/depts/hort/consumer/factsheets/trees-new/cultivars/ulmus_parvifolia.htm Ulmus parvifolia cultivar list.
https://web.archive.org/web/20030413074605/http://fletcher.ces.state.nc.us/programs/nursery/metria/metria11/warren/elm.htm Return of the Elm - the status of elms in the nursery industry in 2000. Warren, K., J. Frank Schmidt and Co.

Chinese elm cultivar
Ulmus articles with images
Ulmus